Pinus gerardiana, commonly known as the chilghoza pine or neja is a pine native to the northwestern Himalayas in Afghanistan, northern Pakistan, Waziristan and northwestern India, growing at elevations of . It often occurs in association with Cedrus deodara and Pinus wallichiana.

Description

However, crowns are narrower and shallower in dense forests. The bark is very flaky, peeling to reveal light greyish-green patches. The branchlets are smooth and olive-green. They are glossy green on the outer surface, with blue-green stomatal lines on the inner face; their sheaths fall in the first year.

Similar species

P. gerardiana is similar to the closely related lacebark pine (Pinus bungeana), another pine with flaking bark. However, P. gerardiana has denser, longer, and more slender needles, as well as larger cones than P. bungeana.

Taxonomy

The scientific name commemorates Captain Patrick Gerard, a British army officer of the Bengal Native Infantry who collected it during a 1823–25 military survey in India.

Distribution and habitat

P. gerardiana is native to Afghanistan, Tibet in China, Jammu-Kashmir in India, and Pakistan. Since it grows at high, mountainous altitudes, it inhabits valley floors in between high mountain ranges in the Himalayas, tending to grow among open vegetation on dry, sunny slopes.

Conservation

In 2011, this species was listed as near threatened on the IUCN Red List of Threatened Species. It was previously listed as Lower Risk/near threatened in 1998. P. gerardina forests have declined by an estimated 30% due to conversion of pine forests to farmland, intensive grazing, and overharvesting of the seed cones and timber for firewood. The Himachal Pradesh State Forest Department has tried artificial regeneration of chilgoza pine at many places. However, performance of seedlings was found to be very poor.

Ecology

Since their seeds do not have a wing capable of enabling effective dispersal by wind, the seeds of P. gerardiana are dispersed by birds. The Eurasian nutcracker (Nucifraga caryocatactes subsp. multipunctata) is one such species that does so.

P. gerardiana is also a secondary host for Himalayan dwarf mistletoe.

Uses

Older trees that don't produce enough cones to harvest pine nuts from are felled for firewood. The wood is also used for local light construction and carpentry.

Food

Chilghoza seeds, or pine nuts, are harvested for consumption in autumn and early winter by knocking the cones off of the trees. The trees and seed harvesting rights are owned by local mountain clans and villages in some areas, from which they may be exported to markets in the northern Indian plains. In traditional harvesting practices, enough seeds are left behind for the forest to regenerate, but in areas controlled by private contractors, all cones are harvested.

Chilgoza pine nuts are rich in carbohydrates and proteins. The seeds are locally referred to and marketed as "chilgoza", "neja" (singular) or "neje" (plural). Chilghoza is one of the most important cash crops of Afghanistan, as well as of Kinnaur and Pangi Valley of Chamba district of Himachal Pradesh, India. They are sold at approximately $20–$53 per kilograms in India.

References

External links 

 Gymnosperm Database: Pinus gerardiana
 Photo of chilgoza pine cone
 Picture of chilgoza pine seed
 Chilgoza.net pine nuts info

gerardiana
Trees of Afghanistan
Edible nuts and seeds
Trees of temperate climates
Drought-tolerant trees
Near threatened plants